Jan Kłaczek (25 December 1928 – 28 January 2005) was a Polish footballer. He played in one match for the Poland national football team in 1953.

References

External links
 

1928 births
2005 deaths
Polish footballers
Poland international footballers
Place of birth missing
Association footballers not categorized by position